Precenicco is a comune (municipality) in the Province of Udine in the Italian region Friuli-Venezia Giulia, located about  northwest of Trieste and about  southwest of Udine.

The municipality of Precenicco contains the frazione (subdivision) Titiano.

Precenicco borders the following municipalities: Latisana, Marano Lagunare, Palazzolo dello Stella.

Demographic evolution

References

External links
 www.comune.precenicco.ud.it/

Cities and towns in Friuli-Venezia Giulia